The Telsitna Formation is a geologic formation in Alaska. It preserves fossils dating back to the Ordovician period.

See also 
 List of fossiliferous stratigraphic units in Alaska
 Paleontology in Alaska

References 

Geologic formations of Alaska
Ordovician System of North America
Ordovician Alaska
Limestone formations of the United States
Ordovician northern paleotropical deposits
Ordovician southern paleotropical deposits
Ordovician northern paleotemperate deposits
Ordovician southern paleotemperate deposits
Ordovician north paleopolar deposits